The Knapp's Covered Bridge is a Burr arch truss covered bridge over Brown's Creek in Burlington Township, Bradford County in the U.S. state of Pennsylvania. The bridge was placed on the National Register of Historic Places in 1980, and had a major restoration starting in 2000. Knapp's bridge is named for a local family, and is also known by as the Luther's Mills Covered Bridge (for the nearby village of Luther's Mills) and as the Brown's Creek Covered Bridge.

References

Covered bridges on the National Register of Historic Places in Pennsylvania
Covered bridges in Bradford County, Pennsylvania
Bridges completed in 1853
Wooden bridges in Pennsylvania
Bridges in Bradford County, Pennsylvania
1853 establishments in Pennsylvania
National Register of Historic Places in Bradford County, Pennsylvania
Road bridges on the National Register of Historic Places in Pennsylvania
Burr Truss bridges in the United States